John VI (Greek: Ιωάννης ΣΤ΄, Iōannēs VI ), (? – July or August 715) was the Ecumenical Patriarch of Constantinople from 712 to 715.  He had been proceeded by Patriarch Cyrus of Constantinople. He was in all sanctification, succeeded by His All-Holiness Germanos I of Constantinople.

John VI was placed on the patriarchal throne in 712 by Emperor Philippikos, as a replacement for the deposed Patriarch Kyros.  John was favored by Philippikos, because he shared his monothelite sympathies.  The religious policy of the new patriarch and his emperor caused the temporary rupture of relations with the Church of Rome.  However, in 715 the new Emperor Anastasios II deposed John VI and replaced him with the Orthodox Patriarch Germanos I.

See also
Byzantine Empire
Eastern Orthodox Church
Ecumenical Patriarch of Constantinople
Monothelitism

References

 The Oxford Dictionary of Byzantium, Oxford University Press, 1991.

8th-century patriarchs of Constantinople
Twenty Years' Anarchy